Arunca River is a river in Portugal. It is located in the municipalities of Soure and Montemor-o-Velho.

References

Rivers of Portugal